Lempira de Guaruma FC is a Honduran football club, based in La Lima originally from banana field Guaruma Uno, Honduras.

History
Originally from La Lima Cortes, he was a local at the Francisco Morazan stadium in San Pedro Sula.

He was originally from banana field Guaruma Uno, there was an exaggerated devotion to playing soccer by children and adults in that field, there were times when the field to play soccer was insufficient in terms of time for everyone to play, hence the excellent players that Guaruma produced One.

They supported him as much as they could, even doing dances, to raise funds for the club.

Lempira that ascended to the Liga Nacional de Primera División in 1968, defeating Broncos de Choluteca twice in the promotion final, with scores of 2-1 and 2-0.

It was in the first division of the Honduran national league in the 1969, 1970 and 1971 seasons, a season in which it was relegated to the second division, They were relegated to second division for the 1971–72 season, drawing 0-0 with Vida

Its top leader was Dr. D.L. Richardson, an American national, who was chief of the Briden, where the Cloth
did agricultural research, excellent manager, like very few, also had a team in the middle league, called Briden,
and managed it as a Lempira reserve.

Years later, Lempira tried to return to the privileged league, but could not, we remember when in the final of the northern zone in 1974 against Atlántida de La Ceiba; In the first visiting game, Guaruma Uno won 3 to 1, but lost to Morazán in the return leg 4 to 0.

Then in 1979 against the Ribereña Youth of El Progreso; goalless draw at Morazán, they lost 3 to 2 in the visit to Humberto Micheletti.

In 1986 he sold the category while in the Second Division, a commercial name was added to his name (Lempira de Hermacasa), his identity was disrespected in every way, they took him to San Pedro Sula, and then at the beginning of the nineties he disappeared.

Among the players who participated in the club are: Dagoberto Cubero, Adolfo "Fito" López, Francisco "Pantera" Velásquez, Amílcar "Mica" López, Jairo López Alcerro, Melchor Argeñal, César Augusto Dávila Puerto, Robert Anthony "Charola" Gaynor, Samuel de Jesús "Chamel" Tejada, Carlos Alberto Acosta "El Indio" Lara, Mario Felipe "Cofra" Caballero Álvarez, Rigoberto Martínez, Eleazar Rodríguez, his coach was Rolando "Pato" López.

Achievements
Segunda División
Winners (1): 1968–69

League performance

Football clubs in Honduras

External links
 diario el Pais.hn por Elmer Manuel Pavón: historia del origen club de futbol Lempira de Guaruma de la Lima, Cortes, honduras